The Pan American Men's Club Handball Championship, organized by the Pan-American Team Handball Federation, was the official competition for men's handball clubs of Americas, and took place every year. In addition to crowning the Pan American champions, the tournament also served as a qualifying tournament for the IHF Super Globe.
After 2018, with the division of the Pan-American Federation into North America and the Caribbean Handball Confederation and South and Central America Handball Confederation, the competition was ended.

Summary 

Source:

Medal table

Per Club

Per Nation

References

External links
 www.panamhandball.org

 
Handball
Pan-American Team Handball Federation competitions
Men's handball competitions
Recurring sporting events established in 2007